For several decades, since at least the 1950s, Mexico has been the world's largest producer and exporter of limes, and especially of lime oil.

The two popular varieties of limes grown in Mexico are the Mexican or Key lime (Citrus aurantifolia) and the Persian lime (Citrus latifolia, simply called "lime" in the US); the former is of Indo–Malayan origin introduced in Mexico by the Spaniards after the 1520s, while the latter, also called the Tahiti lime, was introduced from the United States. Persian lime production in Mexico caters specifically to the US market; a substantial increase in production has been attributed to the North American Free Trade Agreement. Lime production in Mexico has also expanded consequent to the increase in its per capita consumption in the United States and the European Union (EU).

Geographical distribution
Most limes are grown in the warmer southwest (60% of total) and southeast of the country (40%). Key limes amount to about 54% of the total lime production, and are grown in the southwestern states of Jalisco, Colima, Michoacán, Guerrero, and Oaxaca. Persian limes, about 42% of the lime production, are grown in Jalisco, Colima, Hidalgo, in micro-climates in northern Veracruz, and in the southeastern states of Tlaxcala, Chiapas, Tabasco and the Yucatan. The most important lime producing states are Michoacán and Colima.

Characteristics of limes grown in Mexico

Key lime 
The fruit, which is generally  in diameter, as it ripens, changes its peel color from green to pale-yellow. The greenish-yellow pulp of the fruit, with its inseparable 6–15 segments, is juicy and highly acidic with flavor and aroma. It has either a few or many small seeds. Though the climatic conditions under which the Key lime thrives is moist, with annual precipitation in the range of  the tree is more capable of enduring drought conditions than other citrus fruit varieties. However, in excessive rainfall, trees may be infected with fungus. The Key lime is also more sensitive to cold than the lemon, and can be grown only in protected locations.

The Key lime has a longer shelf life than other limes, which is useful since refrigeration facilities are lacking in the country. The tree species of Indo-Malayan origin was introduced to Mexico by Spanish Conquistadors after 1520. Now, 2,000,000 seedling trees are reported near Colima. However, there are very few varieties of the Key lime, except for several spineless selections, inasmuch as there is no great variation in the wild or under cultivation.

Persian lime

Persian limes are larger and contain more juice than Key limes. It is an acid lime which has been developed in recent times. Its origin is inferred as a hybrid of the Key lime and citron.

The Persian or Tahiti lime tree grows to  height, with broad lanceolate leaves and slightly purple-tinged flowers (with no viable pollen) mostly in January. The fruit has vivid green peel till it ripens to pale-yellow. Its pulp with 10 segments of light greenish-yellow color is normally seedless.

Production statistics and organized crime
The biggest focus of Mexican citrus production is on Key limes; in 2003, Mexico produced 768,000 tonnes of Key limes and 235,000 tonnes of Persian limes. For the 2010/11 season, Mexico forecasts that it will produce a total of 1.9 million tonnes of limes. The largest importers of lime oil are the US, UK, Japan, Ireland and Belgium.

In recent years, the Persian lime industry has taken off in Veracruz, dominated by large-scale producers, with over 25% of limes being produced using micro-jet irrigation or other irrigation systems, year-round in micro-climates. Transportation costs from Veracruz to the US border are reported to be approximately 11,500 pesos (US$912.69) per trailer, depending on fuel prices.

In 2014, production problems resulted in unusually high lime prices in the United States and substitution of cheaper lemons for some uses. These were caused by bad weather, citrus greening disease, and the organized crime activities of the Knights Templar Cartel, which extorted producers and seized shipments and farms.
In 2019, the Jalisco New Generation Cartel seized lime farms in Michoacán and then abandoned them a few months later. The economic aftereffects of this disruption, along with cold weather, contributed to another price spike in 2022.

References 

Mexico
Agriculture in Mexico
Citrus production